Best play may refer to:

 Best response, the game theoretic concept of a strategy that produces the most favorable outcome for a player
 Best Play (book), by chess theoretician Alexander Shashin

One of several awards:

 Tony Award for Best Play, an annual American award honoring Broadway theater productions
 Best Play ESPY Award, an annual award in the North American professional sports leagues
 Helpmann Award for Best Play, an annual award in Australian theatre